Kristina Carlson (born 31 July 1949 in Helsinki), also known by her pen name Mari Lampinen, is a Finnish novelist, poet and writer.

Her novels include Maan ääreen, Herra Darwinin puutarhuri and William N. Päiväkirja. She has also written several books for young adults. Carlson lives in Helsinki.

Selected works
 Maan ääreen (To the End of the Earth, 1999; winner of Finlandia Prize for Fiction)
 Herra Darwinin puutarhuri (Mr Darwin's Gardener, 2009)
 William N. Päiväkirja (William N. Diary, 2011)

References

1949 births
Living people
Writers from Helsinki
Finnish women novelists
20th-century Finnish women writers
21st-century Finnish women writers
International Writing Program alumni
20th-century Finnish novelists
21st-century Finnish novelists